Citroën Aircross may refer to:

 Citroën Aircross, a crossover-styled MPV based on the C3 Picasso, later renamed Citroën C3 Aircross
 Citroën C3 Aircross, a standalone subcompact SUV
 Citroën C4 Aircross, a compact SUV based on the Mitsubishi ASX and the Peugeot 4008
 Citroën C5 Aircross, a standalone compact SUV